Thomas Watkins is a fictional character in the TV series Upstairs, Downstairs.

Thomas or Tom Watkins may also refer to:

Thomas C. Watkins (1818–1903), Canadian writer
Tom Watkins (music manager) (1949–2020), British pop impresario, writer, composer, designer and fine art collector
Tom Watkins (politician), former member of the Ohio House of Representatives
Tom Watkins (American football) (1937–2011), American football running back
Tommy Watkins (born 1980), baseball player and minor league coach

See also
Thomas & Sarah, a British drama series, featuring the character

Thomas Watkin (disambiguation)